The Wicomico River is a  tributary of the Chesapeake Bay on the eastern shore of Maryland. It drains an area of low marshlands and farming country in the middle Delmarva Peninsula.

The lower  of the river form a tidal estuary.

The gentle free-flowing river is a popular destination for recreational canoeing and kayaking, as well as recreational fishing and crabbing. The river has also become a hotspot for water sports such as wakeboarding and water skiing due to its consistently smooth surface. Barge traffic on the river has made Salisbury the primary shipping point for goods on the Delmarva Peninsula over the last several centuries. Two automobile cable ferries cross the river at Whitehaven and Upper Ferry.

A civic group, the Wicomico Creekwatchers, have been testing water quality at 22 different points along the river since 2002.  The City of Salisbury partners with Wicomico Creekwatchers, and provides funding.  Their 2016 report, released in April 2017, showed that the water quality decreased compared to 2015, with higher levels of phosphorus, nitrogen, and bacteria.

Etymology
The name Wicomico derives from the Nanticoke words , meaning "a place where houses are built," referring to a Native American village on the banks. The river shares the same name with the Wicomico River (a tributary of the Potomac River) in south-central Maryland.

Tributaries
There are various tributaries and ponds which contribute to the Wicomico River.
Beaverdam Creek
Colbourne Mill Pond
Johnson Pond
Parker Pond
Rockawalkin Creek
Schumaker Pond
Shiles Creek
Tony Tank Pond
Wicomico Creek

References

External links
 http://www.wicomicoriver.org - this website includes information on the natural and cultural history of the river, as well as recreational opportunities. 
 https://www.salisbury.edu/wicomicocreekwatchers/ - this website includes water quality data (primarily nitrogen and phosphorus) going back to 2002.
The Wicomico River

Tributaries of the Chesapeake Bay
Rivers of Maryland
Rivers of Wicomico County, Maryland